Recognition may refer to:

Award, something given in recognition of an achievement

Machine learning
Pattern recognition, a branch of machine learning which encompasses the meanings below

Biometric 
Recognition of human individuals, or biometrics, used as a form of identification and access control
Facial recognition system, a system to identify individuals by their facial characteristics
Fingerprint recognition, automated method of verifying a match between two human fingerprints
Handwritten biometric recognition, identifies the author of specific handwriting, offline (static) or in real-time (dynamic)
Iris recognition, a method of biometric identification

Linguistic 
Language identification, the problem of identifying which natural language given content is in
Natural language understanding, the parsing of the meaning of text
Speech recognition, the conversion of spoken words into text
Speaker recognition, the recognition of a speaker from their voice

Textual 
Handwriting recognition, the conversion of handwritten text into machine-encoded text
Magnetic ink character recognition, used mainly by the banking industry
Optical character recognition, the conversion of typewritten or printed text into machine-encoded text
Automatic number plate recognition, the use of optical character recognition to read vehicle registration plates

Other meanings in computer science 
Activity recognition, the recognition of events from videos or sensors
Gesture recognition, the interpretation of human gestures
Named entity recognition, the classification of elements in text into predefined categories
Object recognition
Optical mark recognition, the capturing of human-marked data from document forms
Sound recognition

Neuroscience and psychology 
Visual object recognition
Face perception, the process by which the human brain understands and interprets the face
Pareidolia, a psychological phenomenon in which a vague stimulus is perceived as significant
Recall (memory), the retrieval of events or information from the past
Emotion recognition
Pattern recognition (psychology)

In other sciences 
Recognition (sociology), a public acknowledgement of person's status or merits
Antigen recognition, in immunology
Intra-species recognition, the recognition of another member of the same species
Molecular recognition, the interaction between two or more molecules through non-covalent bonding

Arts and entertainment
"The Recognition", a science fiction short story by J. G. Ballard
"The Recognitions", a 1955 postmodernist novel by William Gaddis
Recognition, an EP by The Europeans
Recognise (album), a studio album by Fred V & Grafix, released in 2014
"Recognise", a song by Lost Frequencies from the 2019 album Alive and Feeling Fine
"Recognize" (song), a 2014 song by PartyNextDoor
"Recognize", a song by Ol' Dirty Bastard from the 1999 album Nigga Please
"Recognize", a song by DJ Snake from the 2019 album Carte Blanche

Law
Recognition (parliamentary procedure), the assignment of the floor
Recognition (tax), an income tax concept
Recognition (family law), a process in some jurisdictions that confers legitimacy on a child
Diplomatic recognition, the acceptance of the sovereignty of a political entity
Legal recognition, recognition of a legal right in a jurisdiction

Other uses
Recognise, a campaign by Reconciliation Australia for constitutional reform
Aircraft recognition, the skill of identifying aircraft on sight
Revenue recognition, in accrual accounting

See also

 
 

ca:Reconeixement
lt:Atpažinimas
nl:Erkenning
pt:Reconhecimento
sr:Рекогниција